The 1958–59 season saw Rochdale compete in the newly formed Football League Third Division.

Statistics
																				
																				

|}

Final League Table

Competitions

Football League Third Division

F.A. Cup

Lancashire Cup

References

Rochdale A.F.C. seasons
Rochdale